Bentheim-Alpen was a short-lived County of the Holy Roman Empire, created as a partition of Bentheim-Steinfurt in 1606. It was remerged to Bentheim-Steinfurt in 1629.

Count of Bentheim-Alpen (1606 - 1629)
Frederick Ludolph (1606 - 1629)

Populated places established in 1606
Counties of the Holy Roman Empire
1606 establishments in the Holy Roman Empire